Fantasy Football League is a British television comedy programme hosted by David Baddiel and Frank Skinner. It was inspired by the Fantasy Football phenomenon which started in the early 1990s and followed on from a BBC Radio 5 programme hosted by Dominik Diamond, although the radio and TV versions overlapped by several months. Three series were broadcast from 14 January 1994 to 10 May 1996 (followed by episodes during Euro 96). The show then moved to ITV for live specials on alternate nights throughout the 1998 World Cup and then again through Euro 2004. In May 2022 it was announced that a new series of the show had been commissioned to be broadcast on Sky Max with new hosts Elis James and Matt Lucas.

According to Frank Skinner in 2010, the series would never return because it had been superseded by other programmes of a similar style. After it finished, Baddiel and Skinner went on to produce a series of podcasts for The Times, documenting their experiences while travelling across Germany at the 2006 World Cup. The success of these led to the duo being signed by Absolute Radio, where they hosted a similar show from South Africa during the 2010 World Cup.

Format
The format was originally heavily reliant on an actual fantasy football league, made up of teams picked by regular guest celebrities at the point that the game became popular in the mid-1990s. Each week, one or more of the celebrities would appear on the show and chat about football and their fantasy line-ups. As the show progressed on television, however, the fantasy league was pushed to the background in favour of sketches and clips, and was eventually dropped altogether. The latter shows still had guest appearances, from the likes of Nick Hornby, Damon Albarn, Peter Cook etc., although the departure of the fantasy team format meant it was less essential the guests had a decent football knowledge than before.

The television set was designed as a mock-up of the London flat where the hosts were purported to live (the two did indeed share a flat for some years, and the set was partially inspired by it), the idea being to represent the environment in which normal "lads" watch football at home.  Celebrity guests would stand outside the "front door" of the set and ring the "doorbell" (always prompting Baddiel or Skinner to wonder out loud, "Who could that be?") before being let in and announced.

In the 'kitchen' area stood the third regular on the show, Angus Loughran, referred to only as "Statto". Clad only in a dressing gown and pyjamas, he would dispense footballing facts and statistics on demand, particularly in the early shows when the fantasy league element was strongest. He was the butt of many of Frank and David's jokes, and was often made fun of for being apparently dull and naive, but quickly became an audience favourite (with chants of "Statto! Statto!" becoming common later in the run). In the Sky era, comedian and BT Sport presenter Andrew Mensah takes Loughran's former role.

Segments
Other recurring moments in the show included:
 Phoenix from the Flames – David and Frank recreate a famous moment from footballing history, usually with a retired pro or other famous footballing figure.  This was a regular feature on the show recreating a famous moment from footballing history with one of the people involved at the time.  Up to the last episode of the programme, on 3 July 2004, the number of recreations had reached 84.
Jeff Astle Sings – former West Bromwich Albion player (and Frank's idol) Jeff Astle would come in at the end of the show and lead the guests in an improbable rendition of a classic song over the credits. A minute's silence was broadcast on the show in his memory in UEFA Euro 2004 due to his death two years earlier, and various ex-players (e.g., Simon Garner, Brian Kilcline) continued the tradition by singing on the show. For the Sky revival, Lee Trundle (introduced as "my hero, Swansea City legend" by Elis James) sings out the show.
The Big Hello – David and Frank would announce that they were going to say a 'Big Hello' to someone (usually some relatively obscure person with a connection to football) who would then say 'hello' on a pre-recorded video clip. The whole studio would then reply with a very loud (big!) "HELLO". After Germany were eliminated from Euro 2004, this was as a one-off changed to "A big goodbye" with the pre-recorded clip being the goal that knocked them out of the competition.
A Few Things We've Noticed from Watching Football (this week/recently) – Amusing clips that may have gone unnoticed by the viewer when originally shown. These often provided the basis for sketches or other gags later in the episode.

Controversies
Skinner and Baddiel performed a sketch with toys, using a Mr. Potato Head to portray Nottingham Forest manager Frank Clark and a toy footballer with a (genuine) pineapple on top to portray Forest striker Jason Lee and his unusual hairstyle. This led to Lee suffering torrents of abuse from fans at actual matches, including chants like "He's got a pineapple, on his head, he's got a big pineapple, on his head!" (to the tune of "He's Got the Whole World in His Hands" by Laurie London). Some sketches also featured David Baddiel in blackface. In response to the racism, Lee said: "I'd ask them if they realised the significance of what they were doing. It was, looking back, a form of bullying. I work in equalities now, and it can affect different people in different ways. I don't think people appreciate the possible harm it can cause. Not everyone has the make-up to deal with that, and they shouldn't have to." Baddiel has since admitted that his portrayal of Lee was "part of a very bad racist tradition". In an interview with The Guardian in July 2022, Skinner said "When Dave walked out from makeup that night, I still don’t know why one or both of us or someone there didn’t say what the fuck is happening?", he also added "Looking back, it was a bullying campaign. And it’s awful. And yeah, I’m ashamed of it."
 Jimmy Greaves and Ian St John (Saint and Greavsie) made a rare appearance back together as guests on the show during Euro 2004. Although idolised by Skinner and Baddiel, St John admitted in his autobiography he had not enjoyed the experience. The two were likely to have been invited on as they were often parodied by Skinner (as Saint) and Baddiel (Greavsie) in the early series talking about the Endsleigh League (then the tier immediately below the Premiership) as if 'it's important' — a reference to the fact the ITV only had the rights to the Football League and not to either the Premiership (owned by Sky with highlights on the BBC) or the FA Cup (owned by the BBC and Sky) at the time.
 Brigitte Nielsen was a guest on the first episode of the 1998 series along with musician Jean-Michel Jarre but was under the influence of alcohol throughout most of the episode. Nielsen's behaviour was erratic throughout the show, including taking David Baddiel's glasses, attacking him with a Danish pastry and exposing the top of her breasts to the audience whilst making slurred and unintelligible speeches. At one point, Frank Skinner told Brigitte to "sit down, you're making a twat of yourself". This appearance later was featured on a number of "TV Moments From Hell" compilations.

Theme song
The show's theme song consisted of the words "Fantasy Football League" sung over and over to the tune of "Back Home", the England team's official song from the 1970 World Cup. After the move to ITV for the 1998 World Cup, the theme was changed to that formerly used by the channel's World of Sport series. For the Euro 2004 series, the theme was changed again to the one formerly used on the Saint and Greavsie show. The Sky revival uses an instrumental version of "Back Home", with a short sting based on this used for the 'Phoenix from the Flames' graphic.

The various cutaway segments in the show (such as Phoenix From The Flames) would usually be introduced by having their titles sung over the show's main theme tune (though a few clip series had their own specific music). The names of the celebrity guests were also sung in this way as they made their way into the "flat". This has continued in the Sky revival.

References

External links

1994 British television series debuts
1990s British comedy television series
2000s British comedy television series
2020s British comedy television series
1990s British sports television series
2000s British sports television series
2020s British sports television series
Association football television series
BBC television comedy
English-language television shows
Football League
ITV comedy
Sky UK original programming
Race-related controversies in television
Television series by ITV Studios
British television series revived after cancellation